Kenny Burrell (also reissued as Blue Moods) is an album by guitarist Kenny Burrell recorded in 1957 and released on the Prestige label.

Reception

In the Allmusic review by Scott Yanow, he stated: "Guitarist Kenny Burrell, 25 at the time, is heard during one of his earlier sessions playing in his already recognizable straight-ahead style with a quintet... It's enjoyable music".

Track listing 
 "Don't Cry Baby" (Saul Bernie, James P. Johnson, Stella Unger) - 8:20    
 "Drum Boogie" (Roy Eldridge, Gene Krupa) - 9:14    
 "Strictly Confidential" (Bud Powell) - 6:25    
 "All of You" (Cole Porter) - 6:17    
 "Perception" (Kenny Burrell) - 6:05

Personnel 
Kenny Burrell - guitar
Cecil Payne - baritone saxophone (except track 4)
Tommy Flanagan - piano 
Doug Watkins - bass
Elvin Jones - drums

The album was reissued in 1964 as Blue Moods (Prestige 7308).

References 

Kenny Burrell albums
1957 albums
Albums produced by Bob Weinstock
Albums recorded at Van Gelder Studio
Prestige Records albums